Salesian Secondary College, formerly Copsewood College, is a secondary school located outside the village of Pallaskenry, County Limerick, Ireland.  The  school campus is owned by the Salesians and shared with Pallaskenry Agricultural College.  There are approximately 500 students enrolled in the schools co-educational program.  The principal is Ms. Morgan O’Brien

The school's webpage describes its mission as providing an education "based on Christian/Catholic values" while incorporating "the characteristics of Salesian Education".  The basis of that pedagogy is the Salesian Preventive System, which is based on the experience of the 19th-century Saint John Bosco.

Curriculum
Salesian Secondary College's curriculum comprises six-year post-primary education, with a three-year junior cycle to the Junior Certificate and a three-year senior cycle to the Leaving Certificate.

History and facilities
Local legend describes that Copsewood was named in the 19th century for Fr. Michael Copps, who lived in the house.  The Salesians first took possession of Copsewood House in 1919.  The boys-only missionary school opened in 1920 with 100 students, 80 of them boarders.  The Agricultural School opened the same year.  Many of the early students were involved in "The Troubles" and sought daytime refuge in the school by enrolling.  In 1948 the missionary school was recognized by the Department of Education as a secondary school and began to receive government funding for teacher salaries.  The school  open to day-pupils.  By 1957 missionary students had been phased out.  The diocese permitted the school to become a secondary school, without missionary programs, to serve as a feeder school for the Agricultural College. The school offered subjects such as technical drawing, woodwork, metalwork, physics, chemistry, botany, and economics which were not then common in many schools at that time and were seen as an important grounding for agricultural students.  From this came the development of the school's well-equipped science labs in the 1950s and 1960s.  Boarding was phased out and ended in 1995, with the dormitory space converted into classrooms. The secondary school is now recognized as a regional leader in information technology.  In 1972 the school hired its first female teacher and accepted its first female students.

The school facilities include three science labs, a computer lab, a woodwork room, a home economics room, a canteen, a sports hall, a swimming pool and a number of other sporting facilities, including pitches and handball alleys.

Fingerprinting
In 2009 the school introduced an electronic fingerprinting system to assist with daily attendance and monitor absenteeism.  This action gained national attention and the government's Data Protection Commission launched an investigation.

Notable alumni
Darren Shan
Philip Lynch
Alex O'Dwyer

References

External links
 School website
Munster Rugby
Caulfeild Burial Places – Ireland Reaching Out
Pallaskenry Agricultural College
Teagas – Pallaskenry Agricultural College

Secondary schools in County Limerick